Acricoactinidae is a family of sea anemones. It currently includes only one species.

Genera 
The following genera are recognized:

References 

 
Metridioidea
Cnidarian families